Thyagarajan Nandagopal is an engineer at the National Science Foundation in Arlington, Virginia. He was named a Fellow of the Institute of Electrical and Electronics Engineers (IEEE) in 2016 for his contributions to wireless network optimization, RFID systems, and network architectures.

References 

Fellow Members of the IEEE
Living people
Year of birth missing (living people)
Place of birth missing (living people)
American electrical engineers